San Esteban may refer to:

Places
San Esteban, Chile
San Esteban, Olancho, Honduras
San Esteban Island, Sonora, Mexico
San Esteban, a barangay in Nabua, Camarines Sur, Philippines
San Esteban, Ilocos Sur, Philippines
San Esteban (Morcín), Asturias, Spain
San Esteban National Park, Venezuela
Gulf of San Esteban, Western Patagonia

Buildings
San Esteban, Burgos, a former Catholic church, now museum, in Spain
San Esteban, San Salvador, a historic Roman Catholic church in El Salvador
Church of San Esteban (disambiguation)
Al-Andalusian palatial complex and neighborhood of San Esteban, a Moorish archaeological site in Murcia, Spain

Ships
San Esteban (1554 shipwreck), a Spanish cargo ship wrecked off the coast of what is now Texas
San Esteban (1588 shipwreck), a ship of the Spanish Armada wrecked on the west coast of Ireland
San Esteban (1607 shipwreck), a Spanish galleon wrecked on the coast of France
San Esteban Apedreado, a Spanish fifth rate frigate launched in 1726 and broken up in 1744

See also

St. Stephen (disambiguation)